Seela may refer to:
Max Seela (1911–1999), Nazi German Waffen-SS officer
Seela Misra, American singer-songwriter
Seela Sella (born 1936), Finnish film actress
Seela, a polar bear cub who was a subject of the 2007 American documentary Arctic Tale

See also
Seela Sing'isi, an administrative ward in the Meru District of the Arusha Region of Tanzania